The Addicted Tour was the third headlining concert tour by American pop singer Kelly Clarkson. It was a United States tour beginning on June 30, 2006, in West Palm Beach, Florida and ended on August 6, in Auburn, Washington. The tour was in support of her second studio album, Breakaway (2004), following The Breakaway Tour (2005–06) and Hazel Eyes Tour (2005).

Show synopsis
The show begins pitch black with the music of "Addicted" being played, then there is a silhouette of one of the band members on violin. After a few measures of him playing, a silhouette of Clarkson appears. When the violinist stops playing Clarkson begins to sing "It's like I can't breathe" and the curtain comes up in one swift motion. She then goes into the rest of the chorus and finishes the rest of the song. Clarkson ended the night with "Since U Been Gone"

The tour's set list includes songs that would later appear on Clarkson's third studio album My December (2007).

Opening act
Rooney

Setlist
"Addicted"
"I Hate Myself For Losing You"
"Behind These Hazel Eyes"
"Maybe"
"Gone"
"Anymore"
"Shelter" 
"Because of You"
"Thankful"
"Home" 
Miss Independent"
"Go"
"Beautiful Disaster"
"Hear Me"
"Yeah"
"Walk Away"
Encore
"Breakaway"
"Since U Been Gone"

Tour dates

Box office score data

References

External links

2006 concert tours
Kelly Clarkson concert tours